Naša TV is a private national and satellite television channel in North Macedonia. The channel mostly retranslates programs it produces.

This Tv been broadcaster French football league Ligue 1

References

External links
 
 Naša TV at LyngSat Address
 Naša TV live

Television channels in North Macedonia